Hard and soft G in Dutch refers to a phonetic phenomenon of the pronunciation of the letters  and  and also a major isogloss within that language.

The allophony between those two types of fricatives is termed soft G in Dutch dialectology.

In northern dialects of Dutch, the distinction (if present at all) is not consistent and is best described as a fortis–lenis contrast, rather than a contrast of voicing. In addition,  is usually a post-velar fricative with a simultaneous voiceless uvular trill: . This is termed hard G in Dutch dialectology. It is also used in Afrikaans, so that the Afrikaans word  'good' has the same pronunciation as in Northern Dutch, in addition to having the same meaning in both languages.

Speakers normally use those pronunciations in both standard language and the local dialect. The only exception to that are speakers from the southern Netherlands that have undergone accent reduction training, in which case they will use a trill fricative when speaking standard Dutch. It is very rare for speakers to use the hard G when speaking Brabantian or Limburgish.

In Ripuarian, the voiced  has been so fronted as to merge with the palatal approximant  (except after back vowels); cf. Those dialects are also an exception to the rule, as they switch over to the respective standard pronunciation when speaking Standard Dutch (in which case  is used) or, on the other side of the border (e.g. in Herzogenrath, where the Kerkrade dialect is also spoken), Standard German (in which case  is used).

Pronunciation
Verhoeven and Hageman have found that 70% of word-initial and 56% of intervocalic lenis fricatives (which includes  and ) are realized as fully voiceless in Belgium. In Maastrichtian Limburgish, initial  is often partially devoiced as well.

In Northern Dutch,  appears immediately before voiced consonants and sometimes also between vowels. In this article,  is used, even though the fricative portion is usually more front than cardinal uvulars.

Geographical distribution
The hard  is used primarily in the northern part of the Dutch language area in Europe:
 All of the Netherlands, except the provinces of Limburg and most parts of North Brabant, and some dialects of Gelderland and Utrecht
 Most dialects of West Flanders and East Flanders. Since those dialects normally feature h-dropping, no confusion arises.

It is also used in Afrikaans, a daughter language of Dutch. It is spoken in South Africa, Namibia, Botswana, Zambia and Zimbabwe.

The soft  is used primarily in the southern part of the Dutch language area in Europe:
 The Netherlands
The provinces of Limburg and North Brabant, except for small parts of North Brabant (e.g. Bergen op Zoom).
Parts of the province of Gelderland namely the Bommelerwaard, Betuwe, the region south of Nijmegen, Land van Maas en Waal, the southern part of the Veluwe and the Achterhoek.
The southeastern part of the province of Utrecht.
 Dutch-speaking Belgium except for most of West Flanders and East Flanders.

References

Bibliography

See also
 Dutch phonology
 Afrikaans phonology

Consonants
Dutch language
Dutch phonology
Afrikaans